Claudia Mabel Castro Gutiérrez (born 28 April 1968) is a Chilean entrepreneur who is member of the Chilean Constitutional Convention.

References

External links
 
 BCN Profile

Living people
1968 births
Members of the Chilean Constitutional Convention
21st-century Chilean politicians
21st-century Chilean women politicians
People from Santiago